Abdur Rashid ( – 14 May 2017) was a Bangladeshi academic and politician from Mymensingh belonging to Bangladesh Awami League. He was a member of the Jatiya Sangsad.

Biography
Rashid was the principal of Nazrul Degree College. He was elected as a member of the Jatiya Sangsad from Mymensingh-17 in 1973.

Rashid died on 14 May 2017 at Central Hospital in Dhaka at the age of 79.

References

1930s births
2017 deaths
1st Jatiya Sangsad members
People from Mymensingh District
Awami League politicians
Bangladeshi academics